Highway 743 is a highway in the Canadian province of Saskatchewan. It runs from Highway 640 near Krasne to Highway 310.

Highway 743 also passes near the communities of Wishart, Bankend, and West Bend. Highway 743 connects with Highways 639 and 35.

See also 
Roads in Saskatchewan
Transportation in Saskatchewan

References 

743